Sheikh Sayera Khatun Medical College is a government medical college in Bangladesh, established in 2011. It is located in Gopalganj. The college is affiliated with Dhaka University as a constituent college.

Sheikh Sayera Khatun Medical College was named after Sheikh Sayera Khatun, mother of Bangabandhu Sheikh Mujibur Rahman, the "Father of the Nation", and grandmother of Prime Minister Sheik Hasina.

Sheikh Sayera Khatun Medical College began with only 50 students and few infrastructure facilities. The first step in its creation and expansion was the training of undergraduate students.

Organization and administration
In 2014, the Directorate General of Health Services (DGHS) was reportedly unable to attract applicants for lectureships at the college in the basic subjects of anatomy, biochemistry, and physiology. As a stop gap measure, the college borrowed teachers from other medical schools in order to keep classes running.

Entrance examination
Every year, after passing their Higher Secondary School Certificate examinations, nearly 90,000 applicants from all over the country sit for the medical college admission test. The top 3000 students get the opportunity to study at the Sheikh Sayera Khatun Medical College.

See also
 List of medical colleges in Bangladesh

References

Medical colleges in Bangladesh
Hospitals in Bangladesh
Educational institutions established in 2011
2011 establishments in Bangladesh